, sometimes transliterated Shimbashi, is a district of Minato, Tokyo, Japan.

Name
Read literally, the characters in Shinbashi mean "new bridge".

History
The area was the site of a bridge built across the Shiodome River in 1604. The river was later filled in. Shinbashi was the Tokyo terminus of the first railway in Japan in 1872. It remains a major railway hub and has since developed into a commercial center, most recently with the construction of the Shiodome "Shiosite" high-rise office complex.

Places in Shinbashi
Reconstructed Shimbashi Station, which now houses a museum and restaurant.
Shiodome Shiosite high-rise commercial complex.
Nakagin Capsule Tower modular commercial-residential high-rise.

Economy
The Shiodome City Center building in Shiodome includes the corporate headquarters and public and investor relations offices of Fujitsu, the headquarters of All Nippon Airways, and the headquarters of ANA subsidiaries Air Nippon and ANA & JP Express. In addition ANA subsidiary Air Japan has some offices in Shiodome City Center. In the late 1960s All Nippon Airways had its headquarters in the Hikokan Building in Shinbashi.

Other companies in Shinbashi include:
Dentsu
Kyodo News
Nippon Television
Nittsu
Panasonic Electric Works (Tokyo head office)
Shiseido
Softbank
Yakult

Train stations

Shimbashi Station (Ginza Line, Keihin-Tohoku Line, Toei Asakusa Line, Yamanote Line, Yokosuka Line, Yurikamome)
Shiodome Station (Toei Oedo Line, Yurikamome)

Education
Minato City Board of Education operates public elementary and junior high schools.

Shinbashi 1-6-chōme is zoned to Onarimon Elementary School (御成門小学校) and Onarimon Junior High School (御成門中学校).

References

External links

Districts of Minato, Tokyo
1604 establishments in Japan